Occator may refer to:

 Occator (mythology), an assistant-god of the Roman goddess Ceres
 Occator (crater), a crater on the planet Ceres, known for its bright spots